Diane Atkinson is a British historian and author who lives in Shoreditch, London.

She has written many books about the Suffragettes, and about women in history, most recently in the centenary of (some) women getting the vote in the UK, covering the detailed experiences of campaigning women in Rise up, women! : the remarkable lives of the suffragettes, Bloomsbury (2018)  "A thrilling and inspiring read! For too long these extraordinary women have been hidden from history. Rise Up Women! should be a standard text in all schools. And will be a treasured handbook for today's feminists -- Harriet Harman MP"

Atkinson also wrote about The Criminal Conversation of Mrs Norton, for Random House (2012). The legal case that George Norton brought against his free-thinking wife Caroline Sheridan for criminal conversation – adultery, that is – in 1836 was a scandal of the Georgian era, that drew in Lord Melbourne and other leading figures. Atkinson's book is "the liberating life story of the first feminist legislator", according to Kathy Lette.

She narrated the stage presentation Elsie and Mairi Go To War at the 2010 Edinburgh Festival.

Atkinson's book Love and Dirt about the marriage of Arthur Munby and Hannah Cullwick was also very widely reviewed and Atkinson contributed to Upstairs Downstairs Love, a Channel Four drama documentary based upon it that was screened on 16 June 2008.

Atkinson was a curator at the Museum of London and prepared their Suffragette exhibition in 1992.

She is a graduate of the University of East Anglia. She married the artist Patrick Hughes in 1986.

Publications 
 Rise up, women! : the remarkable lives of the suffragettes (Bloomsbury, 2018)
The Criminal Conversation of Mrs Norton (Random House, 2012)
 Elsie and Mairi go to War (2009)
 Love and Dirt (2004)
 Funny Girls: Cartooning for Equality, (Penguin, 1997) a book of cartoons about the Suffragette movement
 The Suffragettes in Pictures (1996)
 The Purple, White and Green: Suffragettes in London (Museum of London, 1992)
 Votes for Women (1998).

Reviews 
 Maroulla Joannou, "To defend the oppressed", Gender and History, Vol. 10, No. 2, August 1998, pp. 312–315 – a review of The Suffragettes in Pictures
 Kathryn Hughes, "Book of the Week: A good roll in the muck", The Guardian,, 18 January 2003 – a review of Love and Dirt
 Victoria Lane, "A Dust Wench", The Telegraph, 25 January 2003 – a review of Love and Dirt

References

External links
 Di, the Dauntless – Atkinson's web page.

Living people
Alumni of the University of East Anglia
British historians
British women historians
Feminist historians
Year of birth missing (living people)